Ionia County Airport  is a public airport located 3 mi (5 km) south of Ionia, Michigan. Opened in 1937, the airport is currently owned by Ionia County. It is included in the Federal Aviation Administration (FAA) National Plan of Integrated Airport Systems for 2017–2021, in which it is categorized as a local general aviation facility.

In 2023, the airport approved a measure to place a wind farm within the zoning radius of the airport.

Facilities & aircraft
The airport has two runways. Runway 10/28 is 4298 x 75 ft (1310 x 23 m) and is asphalt. Runway 18/36 is 4261 x 340 ft (1299 x 104 m) and is turf.

For the 12-month period ending December 31, 2021, he airport had 21,500 aircraft operations, an average of 59 per day. This includes 98% general aviation and 2 % military. For the same time period, there are 51 aircraft based on the field: 30 single-engine and 3 multi-engine airplanes as well as 18 gliders.

Fixed-base operators 
One fixed-base operator, Benz Aviation, operates on the field, offering flight instruction, aircraft maintenance, and aerial advertising. Flight instruction consists of a Part 141 flight school as well as glider training.

The School of Missionary Aviation Technology (SMAT) also operates on the field, providing maintenance and flight instruction for aspiring missionary pilot-mechanics.

References

External links
 Benz Aviation
 School of Missionary Aviation Technology
 Michigan Airport Directory - Y70

Airports in Michigan
Buildings and structures in Ionia County, Michigan
Transportation in Ionia County, Michigan